Fábio Jorge Moreira Ferreira (born 26 April 1993) is a Portuguese footballer who plays for Nevogilde as a midfielder.

External links

1993 births
Living people
Portuguese footballers
Association football midfielders
Liga Portugal 2 players
Segunda Divisão players
S.C. Freamunde players
Rebordosa A.C. players
People from Lousada
Sportspeople from Porto District